Thomas McGaughey (born May 8, 1973) is an American football coach and former player who is the special teams coordinator for the New York Giants of the National Football League (NFL). He has previously served the same role for the Carolina Panthers, San Francisco 49ers and New York Jets. It is his second stint with the New York Giants having served as assistant special teams coordinator from 2007 to 2010.

Playing career
McGaughey played as a defensive back at the University of Houston from 1991 to 1995. He was the special teams captain as a senior. McGaughey spent time with the Cincinnati Bengals (1996) and Philadelphia Eagles (1997) of the National Football League (NFL). In 1997 he won NFL Europe’s World Bowl with the Barcelona Dragons. In 1999, he played for the Houston Outlaws in the short-lived Regional Football League.

Coaching career
McGaughey started his coaching career with Houston in 1998 as a graduate assistant. In 2002, he became the assistant special teams coach for the Kansas City Chiefs after a year as a minority intern with them, before returning to Houston to be their special teams coordinator. McGaughey then spent the 2005 and 2006 seasons as assistant special teams coordinator for the Denver Broncos, and the same role for the New York Giants from 2007 to 2010. During his first season with the Giants, the team won Super Bowl XLII by defeating the New England Patriots, 17–14.

McGaughey became special teams coordinator for LSU in 2011 and held the position until 2013.
He spent the following seasons as special teams coordinator for the New York Jets in 2014, San Francisco 49ers in 2015, and Carolina Panthers from 2016 to 2017. On February 11, 2022, McGaughey returned to the New York Giants as special teams coordinator.

References

1973 births
Living people
People from Chicago
Houston Cougars football players
Regional Football League players
Houston Cougars football coaches
Kansas City Chiefs coaches
Denver Broncos coaches
New York Giants coaches
LSU Tigers football coaches
New York Jets coaches
Carolina Panthers coaches
Philadelphia Eagles players
Cincinnati Bengals players
Players of American football from Illinois
Barcelona Dragons players
African-American coaches of American football
African-American players of American football
21st-century African-American sportspeople
20th-century African-American sportspeople